Paranedyopus simplex, is a species of millipedes in the family Paradoxosomatidae. It is endemic to Sri Lanka, first documented from Pundaloya. The species is greatly differ from other members of the genus due to reduced paraterga and more elaborate gonopods.

References

Polydesmida
Millipedes of Asia
Endemic fauna of Sri Lanka
Animals described in 1865